Johnny Lee Davenport (July 24, 1950 – February 2, 2020) was an American actor, known for his role as Marshal Henry in 1993's The Fugitive, a role he reprised in 1998's U.S. Marshals.

Early life
Davenport was born in Shreveport, Louisiana and grew up in Aurora, Illinois. There, he attended West Aurora High School, where he was cast in the school’s production of the musical Carousel . As a student at Southern Illinois University Carbondale, he helped start that school’s acting company.

Death
He died on February 2, 2020, from leukemia.

Film

Shakespeare
After being cast as Antonio in the Stratford Festival of Canada’s production of Twelfth Night in 1988, Davenport made the plays of Shakespeare a major part of his acting repertoire. The following year he became a member of the theater group Shakespeare & Company in Lenox, Massachusetts, and went to perform with the company 16 seasons.
His credits in that venue include Bottom in A Midsummer Night’s Dream, As You Like It, Twelfth Night, Henry IV, Parts 1 & 2, Richard II, the title role in Othello, A Winter’s Tale, Measure for Measure, Richard III, Hamlet,  and Henry V.

Other Stage roles
During the 1990s he performed frequently in Chicago venues, including the Steppenwolf, Court, and Goodman Theaters. Plays in which he appeared include Miss Julie, Cry, the Beloved Country, and Comedians. He also appeared as Chris, the father of Anna Christie in "Anna Christie" by Eugene O'Neill at the Lyric Stage Company of Boston (April 6-May 6, 2018).

Awards and nominations

Davenport was named Best Actor in Boston Magazine for his body of work during the 2010–2011 season and was a recipient of Washington, D.C.’s Helen Hayes Award.

References

External links
Johnny Lee Davenport at the Internet Movie Database
 List of awards and nominations

1950 births
2020 deaths
People from Shreveport, Louisiana
African-American male actors
Male actors from Louisiana
20th-century American male actors
21st-century American male actors
Deaths from leukemia
Deaths from cancer in Massachusetts
20th-century African-American people
21st-century African-American people